A Faraday cage or Faraday shield is an enclosure used to block electromagnetic fields. A Faraday shield may be formed by a continuous covering of conductive material, or in the case of a Faraday cage, by a mesh of such materials. Faraday cages are named after scientist Michael Faraday, who invented them in 1836.

A Faraday cage operates because an external electrical field causes the electric charges within the cage's conducting material to be distributed so that they cancel the field's effect in the cage's interior. This phenomenon is used to protect sensitive electronic equipment (for example RF receivers) from external radio frequency interference (RFI) often during testing or alignment of the device. They are also used to protect people and equipment against actual electric currents such as lightning strikes and electrostatic discharges, since the enclosing cage conducts current around the outside of the enclosed space and none passes through the interior.

Faraday cages cannot block stable or slowly varying magnetic fields, such as the Earth's magnetic field (a compass will still work inside). To a large degree, though, they shield the interior from external electromagnetic radiation if the conductor is thick enough and any holes are significantly smaller than the wavelength of the radiation. For example, certain computer forensic test procedures of electronic systems that require an environment free of electromagnetic interference can be carried out within a screened room. These rooms are spaces that are completely enclosed by one or more layers of a fine metal mesh or perforated sheet metal. The metal layers are grounded to dissipate any electric currents generated from external or internal electromagnetic fields, and thus they block a large amount of the electromagnetic interference. See also electromagnetic shielding. They provide less attenuation of outgoing transmissions than incoming: they can block electromagnetic pulse (EMP) waves from natural phenomena very effectively, but a tracking device, especially in upper frequencies, may be able to penetrate from within the cage (e.g., some cell phones operate at various radio frequencies so while one frequency may not work, another one will).

The reception or transmission of radio waves, a form of electromagnetic radiation, to or from an antenna within a Faraday cage is heavily attenuated or blocked by the cage; however, a Faraday cage has varied attenuation depending on wave form, frequency, or distance from receiver/transmitter, and receiver/transmitter power. Near-field, high-powered frequency transmissions like HF RFID are more likely to penetrate. Solid cages generally attenuate fields over a broader range of frequencies than mesh cages.

History 
In 1836, Michael Faraday observed that the excess charge on a charged conductor resided only on its exterior and had no influence on anything enclosed within it. To demonstrate this fact, he built a room coated with metal foil and allowed high-voltage discharges from an electrostatic generator to strike the outside of the room. He used an electroscope to show that there was no electric charge present on the inside of the room's walls.

Although this cage effect has been attributed to Michael Faraday's famous ice pail experiments performed in 1843, it was Benjamin Franklin in 1755 who observed the effect by lowering an uncharged cork ball suspended on a silk thread through an opening in an electrically charged metal can. In his words, "the cork was not attracted to the inside of the can as it would have been to the outside, and though it touched the bottom, yet when drawn out it was not found to be electrified (charged) by that touch, as it would have been by touching the outside. The fact is singular." Franklin had discovered the behavior of what we now refer to as a Faraday cage or shield (based on Faraday's later experiments which duplicated Franklin's cork and can).

Additionally, in 1754 the Abbe Nollet published an early account of an effect attributable to the cage effect in his Leçons de physique expérimentale.

Operation

Continuous
A continuous Faraday shield is a hollow conductor. Externally or internally applied electromagnetic fields produce forces on the charge carriers (usually electrons) within the conductor; the charges are redistributed accordingly due to electrostatic induction. The redistributed charges greatly reduce the voltage within the surface, to an extent depending on the capacitance; however, full cancellation does not occur.

Interior charges

If a charge is placed inside an ungrounded Faraday shield without touching the walls (let's denote this charge quantity as +Q), the internal face of the shield becomes charged with −Q, leading to field lines originating at the charge and extending to charges inside the inner surface of the metal. The field line paths in this inside space (to the endpoint negative charges) are dependent on the shape of the inner containment walls. Simultaneously +Q accumulates on the outer face of the shield. The spread of charges on the outer face is not affected by the position of the internal charge inside the enclosure, but rather determined by the shape of outer face. So for all intents and purposes, the Faraday shield generates the same static electric field on the outside that it would generate if the metal were simply charged with +Q. See Faraday's ice pail experiment, for example, for more details on electric field lines and the decoupling of the outside from the inside. Note that electromagnetic waves are not static charges.

If the cage is grounded, the excess charges will be neutralized as the ground connection creates an equipotential bonding between the outside of the cage and the environment, so there is no voltage between them and therefore also no field. The inner face and the inner charge will remain the same so the field is kept inside.

Exterior fields

Effectiveness of shielding of a static electric field is largely independent of the geometry of the conductive material; however, static magnetic fields can penetrate the shield completely.

In the case of a varying electromagnetic fields, the faster the variations are (i.e., the higher the frequencies), the better the material resists magnetic field penetration. In this case the shielding also depends on the electrical conductivity, the magnetic properties of the conductive materials used in the cages, as well as their thicknesses.

A good idea of the effectiveness of a Faraday shield can be obtained from considerations of skin depth. With skin depth, the current flowing is mostly in the surface, and decays exponentially with depth through the material. Because a Faraday shield has finite thickness, this determines how well the shield works; a thicker shield can attenuate electromagnetic fields better, and to a lower frequency.

Faraday cage
Faraday cages are Faraday shields which have holes in them and are therefore more complex to analyze. Whereas continuous shields essentially attenuate all wavelengths whose skin depth in the hull material is less than the thickness of the hull, the holes in a cage may permit shorter wavelengths to pass through or set up "evanescent fields" (oscillating fields that do not propagate as EM waves) just beyond the surface. The shorter the wavelength, the better it passes through a mesh of given size. Thus, to work well at short wavelengths (i.e., high frequencies), the holes in the cage must be smaller than the wavelength of the incident wave.

Examples 
 Faraday cages are routinely used in analytical chemistry to reduce noise while making sensitive measurements.
 Faraday cages, more specifically dual paired seam Faraday bags, are often used in digital forensics to prevent remote wiping and alteration of criminal digital evidence.
 The U.S. and NATO Tempest standards, and similar standards in other countries, include Faraday cages as part of a broader effort to provide emission security for computers.
 Automobile and airplane passenger compartments are essentially Faraday cages, protecting passengers from electric charges, such as lightning
 Electronic components in automobiles and aircraft utilize Faraday cages to protect signals from interference. Sensitive components may include wireless door locks, navigation/GPS systems, and lane departure warning systems. Faraday cages and shields are also critical to vehicle infotainment systems (e.g. radio, Wi-Fi, and GPS display units), which may be designed with the capability to function as critical circuits in emergency situations.
 A booster bag (shopping bag lined with aluminium foil) acts as a Faraday cage. It is often used by shoplifters to steal RFID-tagged items.
 Similar containers are used to resist RFID skimming.
 Elevators and other rooms with metallic conducting frames and walls simulate a Faraday cage effect, leading to a loss of signal and "dead zones" for users of cellular phones, radios, and other electronic devices that require external electromagnetic signals. During training, firefighters, and other first responders are cautioned that their two-way radios will probably not work inside elevators and to make allowances for that. Small, physical Faraday cages are used by electronics engineers during equipment testing to simulate such an environment to make sure that the device gracefully handles these conditions.
 Properly designed conductive clothing can also form a protective Faraday cage. Some electrical linemen wear Faraday suits, which allow them to work on live, high-voltage power lines without risk of electrocution. The suit prevents electric current from flowing through the body, and has no theoretical voltage limit. Linemen have successfully worked even the highest voltage (Kazakhstan's Ekibastuz–Kokshetau line 1150 kV) lines safely.
 Austin Richards, a physicist in California, created a metal Faraday suit in 1997 that protects him from tesla coil discharges. In 1998, he named the character in the suit Doctor MegaVolt and has performed all over the world and at Burning Man nine different years.
 The scan room of a magnetic resonance imaging (MRI) machine is designed as a Faraday cage. This prevents external RF (radio frequency) signals from being added to data collected from the patient, which would affect the resulting image. Technologists are trained to identify the characteristic artifacts created on images should the Faraday cage be damaged, such as during a thunderstorm.
 A microwave oven utilizes a partial Faraday shield (on five of its interior's six sides) and a partial Faraday cage, consisting of a wire mesh, on the sixth side (the transparent window), to contain the electromagnetic energy within the oven and to protect the user from exposure to microwave radiation.

 Plastic bags that are impregnated with metal are used to enclose electronic toll collection devices whenever tolls should not be charged to those devices, such as during transit or when the user is paying cash.
 The shield of a screened cable, such as USB cables or the coaxial cable used for cable television, protects the internal conductors from external electrical noise and prevents the RF signals from leaking out.
 Electronic components in some music instruments, such as in an electric guitar, are protected by faraday cages made from copper or aluminum foils which protect the instrument's electromagnetic pickups from interference from speakers, amplifiers, stage lights, and other musical equipment.
 Some buildings, such as prisons, are constructed as a faraday cage because they have reasons to block both incoming and outgoing cellphone calls by prisoners.

See also
 Anechoic chamber
 Anti-static bag
 Conductive textile
 Foil hat
 Gauss's law
 Mobile phone jammer
 Mu-metal
 Mylar blanket
 Tesla coil
 Van de Graaff generator

References

External links 

 Faraday Cage Protects from 100,000 V :: Physikshow Uni Bonn
 Notes from physics lecture on Faraday cages from Michigan State University
 Top Gear's Richard Hammond is protected from 600,000 V by a car (a Faraday Cage).

1836 introductions
Electrical power control
Electrostatics
English inventions
Michael Faraday
Safety equipment
Articles containing video clips